Beihuan Boulevard is a major expressway in Shenzhen, China. It runs from Yueliangwan Boulevard in Nanshan and ends at Shangbu, Futian. Spanning , it is among the longest roads in the city.

See also
Shennan Road
Binhai Boulevard

References 

Roads in Shenzhen
Nanshan District, Shenzhen
Futian District
Transport in Shenzhen